Lantejuela is a municipality located in the province of Seville, Spain, with a population of 3,834 in 2018. The region around Lantejuela is the most likely place for the ancient Battle of Munda.

Name
Until 1860, the village was called Lentejuela. Its official name was changed on 4 February 2014 from La Lantejuela to Lantejuela.

References

External links
 Lantejuela - Sistema de Información Multiterritorial de Andalucía

Municipalities of the Province of Seville